James Heighton (born September 22, 1944) was a defensive lineman who played thirteen seasons in the Canadian Football League, mainly for the Winnipeg Blue Bombers.  He was a CFL West All-Star in 1971, 1974, and 1976, and was also named to the 1972 and 1974 Western Conference All-Star teams as selected by the Football Reporters of Canada. In 1974 and 1976, he won the Dr Bert Oja Award as the Bombers' Most Valuable Lineman. Heighton was also a three-time Schenley award nominee (1974 Most Outstanding Canadian; 1974 Most Outstanding Defenseman; 1976 Most Outstanding Canadian). In 2014, he was inducted into the Winnipeg Blue Bombers Hall of Fame.

As a Masters athlete in Track and Field, Heighton won eight gold medals at the national level in weight throw, hammer throw, shot put and pentathlon (2008, 2013).  He was twice inducted into the Manitoba Baseball Hall of Fame (2009, 2011) as a player for the Giroux Athletics and for the Grosse Isle Blue Jays championship baseball teams. An all-round athlete, Heighton also played on several medal-winning amateur basketball and soccer teams, and was an owner/breeder/racer of thoroughbred horses.  

In 2016, he was named to the Manitoba Sports Hall of Fame.

References

External links 
CFL All-Star teams

1944 births
Living people
BC Lions players
Canadian football defensive linemen
Hamilton Tiger-Cats players
Montreal Alouettes players
Players of Canadian football from British Columbia
Canadian football people from Vancouver
Winnipeg Blue Bombers players